The Selected Characteristics of Occupations (SCO) is a companion volume to the U.S. Department of Labor's Dictionary of Occupational Titles, Revised Fourth Edition, published in 1991.  These volumes were intended to provide a detailed representation of thousands of individual occupations in the United States, for the purpose of occupational information, occupational exploration, and job placement.

The Social Security Administration was particularly interested in the Dictionary of Occupational Titles and the SCO for the purpose of establishing the existence of jobs that a claimant for disability benefits could otherwise perform despite his or her mental and/or physical impairments during disability adjudication within the Social Security Administration.

The Dictionary of Occupational Titles was insufficient for disability adjudication at the Social Security Administration because it did not include enough detail about the physical and environmental demands of the jobs listed therein.  Accordingly, the Social Security Administration requested that the Department of Labor produce a companion volume to the DOT, which would publish data collected as part of the DOT research, but not previously available.  This document is known as the "SCO" or Selected Characteristics of Occupations Defined in the Revised Dictionary of Occupational Titles.

The Social Security Administration's Interest in the SCO

In 1960, Kerner v. Flemming, 283 F.2d 916, 921 (2d Cir. 1960) held that there must be a "rational decision" regarding the vocational issues. In response to Kerner and the underling demand for rationality inherent in District Court review, the SSA undertook a search for vocational evidence to support its disability determinations.

Prior to the publication of the Fourth Edition of the DOT, the Social Security Administration requested estimates of worker traits from the Bureau of Employment Security.

"There was also widespread interest among vocational consultants in an abstract of worker traits and physical requirements for occupations such as the Estimates of Worker Trait Requirements for 4,000 jobs, which had been published with the second edition of the Dictionary of Occupational Titles. Basic information about the physical capacities, working conditions, general educational development and specific vocational preparation requirements for the individual jobs could be ascertained by referral to this work. However, such information was needed in more accessible form for vocational assessment, therefore, the Bureau of Disability Insurance entered into an arrangement whereby the Bureau of Employment Security compiled and published a Supplement to the Dictionary of Occupational Titles. Microfilmed data about occupations furnished by the Labor Department was punched into IBM cards by the Social Security Administration's Division of Accounting Operations. Thus, it was possible to abstract selected data about occupations that would be useful for vocational evaluation. This Supplement, entitled Selected Characteristics of Occupations, was published in 1966 and proved to be a valuable tool in supplementing information provided by a disability claimant regarding his past work and in identifying jobs for which he could qualify."  

As a result of this work, Social Security Administration's Ruling  SSR 00-4p and prior Regulations  explain: "In making disability determinations, we rely primarily on the DOT (including its companion publication, the SCO) for information about the requirements of work in the national economy. We use these publications at steps 4 and 5 of the sequential evaluation process."

What Does the SCO Contain? 

The SCO provides additional data not found in the two volumes of the DOT. In addition to the DOT codes and Guide for Occupational Information Group codes, the SCO provides the following:

SVP	Specific Vocational Preparation

Physical Demands

	SVP	Specific Vocational Preparation
	St	Strength
	Cl	Climbing
	Ba	Balancing
	St	Stooping
	Kn 	Kneeling
	Co	Crouching
	Cw	Crawling
	Re	Reaching
	Ha	Handling
	Fi	Fingering
	Fe	Feeling
	Ta	Talking
	He	Hearing
	Ts	Taste/Smell
	NA	Near Acuity
	FA	Far Acuity
	DP	Depth Perception
	Ac	Accommodation
	CV	Color Vision
	FV	Field of Vision

Environmental Demands

	We	Exposure to Weather
	Co	Extreme Cold
	Ho	Extreme Heat
	Hu	Wet and/or Humid
	No	Noise Intensity Level
	Vi	Vibration
	AC	Atmospheric Conditions
	MP	Proximity to Moving Mechanical Parts
	ES	Exposure to Electric Shock
	HE	Working in High Exposed Places
	Ra	Exposure to Radiation
	Ex	Working with Explosives
	TC	Exposure to Toxic or Caustic Chemicals
	Ot	Other Environmental Conditions

These data are arranged in the SCO in long columns of rows of letters and numbers, which may seem fairly incomprehensible to the uninitiated, such as

6 S NNNNNNNNN NNNNCNNCNN NNNN3NNNNNNNNN
2 S NNNNNNNNN NNNNCNNOOO NFFN3NNNNNNNNN
3 L NNNNNNNNN NNNNCNNCNN NNNN3NNNNNNONN

See also 
Vocational education
Bureau of Labor Statistics
Surveillance system monitor example of a typical occupation in the SCO

External links
U.S. Department of Labor O*net
Social Security Disability Advocacy, Debate, and Professional News
Office of Disability Adjudication and Review (ODAR)
Dictionary of Occupational Titles
Selected Characteristics of the DOT (SCO)

References

Social security in the United States
United States Department of Labor publications